Goornong is a town in north central Victoria, Australia.

A railway station opened in December 2021 as part of the Regional Rail Revival project, in order to serve the area.

References

External links

Towns in Victoria (Australia)
Bendigo
Suburbs of Bendigo